Baha al-Din Muhammad ibn Hasan ibn Isfandiyar, commonly known as Ibn Isfandiyar, was a 13th-century Iranian historian from Tabaristan, who wrote a history of his native province, the Tarikh-i Tabaristan. What little is known of his life comes from the introduction of this work.

Biography 
Ibn Isfandiyar belonged to a prominent bureaucratic family from Amol, the capital of Tabaristan. His father Ḥasan, was a high-ranking court official of the Bavandids, the ruling dynasty of Tabaristan. In his early career, Ibn Isfandiyar was a member of the court of the Bavandids, and enjoyed the patronage of Ardashir I (died 1206). He began compiling material for his history in 1206, which up to then mainly consisted of the "Bavand-nameh", a now-lost work presumably in Persian which our author viewed as a Bavandid romance only. In 1209 he travelled briefly to Baghdad. On his return he stayed for two months in Rayy, where he came across in Rustam b. Shahriyar's library the Uqidu sihr wa-qala'idu durar of Abu 'l-Hasan Muhammad al-Yazdadi - an Arabic history of Tabaristan subsequently lost. Ibn Isfandiyar translated this work into Persian, and this, coupled with genealogical and historical information on the Bavandids, formed the core of his history. He added more material over the years, especially during his five-year stay in Khwarazm. His fate is unknown; he may have returned to his native Tabaristan and died there, or he may have perished in the Mongol sack of Khwarazm in 1220.

His history, which was not completed before 1217/17, ends with the first fall of the Bavandid dynasty in 1210. An anonymous later author continued it up to 1349, when the dynasty’s second period ended, based chiefly on Awliya Allah Amuli's Tarikh-i Ruyan. Ibn Isfandiyar's work includes much unique historical, biographical and geographical information, including verses in Tabari language and a Persian translation of the Letter of Tansar, an important piece of Pahlavi literature, sent by the Sasanian ruler Ardashir I's chief priest to Gushnasp, prince of Tabaristan.

References

Sources 
 
 
 
 
 

12th-century births
13th-century deaths
13th-century Iranian historians
Tabaristan
Mazandarani people
People from Amol